North Carolina's climate varies from the Atlantic coast in the east to the Appalachian Mountain range in the west. The mountains often act as a "shield", blocking low temperatures and storms from the Midwest from entering the Piedmont of North Carolina.

Most of the state has a humid subtropical climate (Köppen climate classification Cfa), except in the higher elevations of the Appalachians which have a subtropical highland climate (Köppen Cfb).

The USDA hardiness zones for the state range from zone 5a (-20 °F to -15 °F) in the mountains to zone 8b (15 °F to 20 °F) along the coast. In January the average temperatures range near .

Precipitation 
There is an average of forty-five inches of rain a year (fifty inches in mountainous regions). July storms account for much of this precipitation. As much as 15% of the rainfall during the warm season in the Carolinas can be attributed to tropical cyclones. Mountains usually see some snow in the fall and winter.

Snow 

Snow in North Carolina is seen on a regular basis in the mountains. North Carolina averages  of snow per winter season. However, this varies greatly across the state. The town of Boone, North Carolina, located at an elevation of 3,333 feet in the northwestern part of the state, averages approximately 45 inches of snow per winter season. The mountains in the west act as a barrier, preventing most snowstorms from entering the Piedmont. When snow does make it past the mountains, it is usually light and is seldom on the ground for more than two or three days. However, several storms have dropped  or more of snow within normally warm areas. The 1993 Storm of the Century that lasted from March 11 to March 15 affected locales from Canada to Central America, and brought exceptionally heavy snow to North Carolina.

There was also a heavy snowfall totaling  that hit the Wilmington area on December 22–23, 1989. This storm affected only the Southeastern US coast, as far south as Savannah, GA, with little to no snow measured west of I-95. Most big snows that impact areas east of the mountains come from extratropical cyclones which approach from the south across Georgia and South Carolina and move off the coast of North or South Carolina. These storms typically throw Gulf or Atlantic moisture over cold Arctic air at ground level, usually propelled southward from Arctic high pressure over the Northeastern or New England states. If the storms track sufficiently far to the east, snow will be limited to the eastern part of the state (as with the December 22–23, 1989 storm, and the January 4, 2018 storm that dropped 4 inches at Cape Hatteras, but virtually no snow in inland North Carolina locations). If the cyclones travel close to the coast, warm air will get pulled into eastern North Carolina due to increasing flow off the milder Atlantic Ocean, bringing a rain/snow line well inland with heavy snow restricted to the Piedmont, foothills and mountains, as with the January 22, 1987 storm that dropped 6 inches at Charlotte. If the storm tracks inland into eastern North Carolina, the rain/snow line ranges between Raleigh and Greensboro.

Tropical cyclones 

Located along the Atlantic Coast, many hurricanes that come up from the Caribbean Sea make it up the coast of eastern America, passing by North Carolina.

On October 15, 1954, Hurricane Hazel struck North Carolina, at that time it was a category 4 hurricane within the Saffir-Simpson Hurricane Scale. Hazel caused significant damage due to its strong winds. The hurricane caused 19 deaths and significant destruction. One person at Long Beach claimed that "of the 357 buildings that existed in the town, 352 were totally destroyed and the other five damaged". Hazel was described as "the most destructive storm in the history of North Carolina" in a 1989 report.

In 1996, Hurricane Fran made landfall in North Carolina. As a category 3 hurricane, Fran caused a great deal of damage, mainly through winds. The amount of damage caused by Fran ranged from $1.275 to $2 billion in North Carolina.

Rain 
Heavy rains accompany tropical cyclones and their remnants which move northeast from the Gulf of Mexico coastline, as well as inland from the western subtropical Atlantic ocean. Unlike Hazel and Fran, the main force of destruction was from precipitation. Before Hurricane Floyd reached North Carolina, the state had already received large amounts of rain from Hurricane Dennis less than two weeks before Floyd. This saturated much of the Eastern North Carolina soil and allowed heavy rains from Hurricane Floyd to turn into floods. Over 35 people died from Floyd.

Severe weather 
In most years, the greatest weather-related economic loss incurred in North Carolina is due to severe weather spawned by summer thunderstorms.  These storms affect limited areas, with their hail and wind accounting for an average annual loss of over US$5 million.

North Carolina averages 31 tornadoes a year with May seeing the most tornadoes on average a month with 5. June, July and August all have an average of 3 tornadoes with an increase to 4 average tornadoes a month in September. It is through September and into early November when North Carolina can typically expect to see that smaller, secondary, severe weather season. While severe weather season is technically from March through May, tornadoes have touched down in North Carolina in every month of the year. On November 28, 1988, an early morning F4 tornado smashed across northwestern Raleigh, continuing 84 miles further, killing 4 and injuring 157. On February 6, 2020, severe storms hit North Carolina, with a tornado beginning in Rowan County, north of Charlotte. as it travelled north, wind speeds picked up to 30 mph. By 4pm, 100 000 people were without power and flash flood warnings were hitting areas in the North and Northwest with this floodwatch staying in full effect until the following Thursday.

Changes

The North Carolina coastline is expected to rise between one and four feet in the next century due to a combination of warming oceans, melting ice, and land subsidence.  Temperatures in North Carolina have risen. Over the last 100 years, the average temperature in Chapel Hill has gone up 1.2 °F (0.7 °C) and precipitation in some parts of the state has increased by 5 percent. Around the year 2080, "temperatures are likely to rise above 95°F approximately 20 to 40 days per year in most of the state, compared with about 10 days per year" in 2016.

Seasonal conditions

Winter 
In winter, North Carolina is somewhat protected by the Appalachian Mountains to the west. Cold fronts from Canada are typically reduced in intensity by the mountains. However, occasionally cold air can move from the north or northeast, east of the Appalachian Mountains, from Arctic high pressure systems that settle over the Northeastern or New England states. Still, temperatures below zero degrees Fahrenheit are extremely rare outside of the mountains. The winter temperatures on the coast are milder due to the warming influence of the Atlantic Ocean and the Gulf Stream. The average ocean temperature in Southport in January is still higher than the average ocean temperature in Maine during July. Snow is common in the mountains, although many ski resorts use snowmaking equipment to make sure there is always snow on their land. North Carolina's relative humidity is highest in the winter.

Spring 
Tornadoes are most likely in the spring. Major tornado outbreaks affected parts of eastern North Carolina on March 28, 1984, and April 16, 2011. The month of May experiences the greatest rise in temperatures. During the spring, there are warm days and cool nights in the Piedmont. Temperatures are somewhat cooler in the mountains and warmer, particularly at night, near the coast. North Carolina's humidity is lowest in the spring.

Summer 

North Carolina experiences high summer temperatures. Sometimes, cool, dry air from the north will invade North Carolina for brief periods of time, with temperatures quickly rebounding. Morning temperatures are on average 20 °F (12 °C) lower than afternoon temperatures, except along the Atlantic Coast. The largest economic loss from severe weather in North Carolina is due to severe thunderstorms in the summer, although they usually only hit small areas. Tropical cyclones can impact the state during the summer as well. Fogs are also frequent in the summer.

Fall 
Fall is the most rapidly changing season temperature wise, especially in October and November.  Tropical cyclones remain a threat until late in the season.  The Appalachian Mountains are frequently visited at this time of year, due to the leaves changing color in the trees.

Southern Oscillation 
During El Niño events, winter and early spring temperatures are cooler than average with above average precipitation in the central and eastern parts of the state and drier weather in the western part. La Niña usually brings warmer than average temperatures with above average precipitation in the western part of the state while the central and coastal regions stay drier than average.

Climate data

See also 
 Climate
 Climate change
 Climate change in North Carolina
 Climatology
 List of North Carolina hurricanes
 List of North Carolina weather records
 List of wettest known tropical cyclones in North Carolina
 Meteorology

References

External links 
 State Climate Office of North Carolina

 
Geography of North Carolina
North Carolina